A coward is a person whose excessive fear prevents them from taking a risk or facing danger, exhibiting cowardice.

Coward(s) or The Coward(s) may also refer to:

Arts and entertainment
The Coward (1915 film), an American silent historical war drama film
The Coward (1927 film), a lost silent drama film
The Coward (1939 film), a Mexican war film
The Coward (1953 film), a Mexican drama film
Cowards (film), a 1970 American drama film
Kapurush (The Coward), 1965 film by Satyajit Ray
The Cowards, a Czech novel by Josef Škvorecký
Cowards (comedy troupe), a British four-man comedy act
Coward (Made Out of Babies album), 2006
Coward (Haste the Day album)
Coward (Nels Cline album), 2009
 "Coward", a song by Black Light Burns from Cruel Melody
 "Coward", a song by Swans that originally appeared on Holy Money
 "Coward", a rap song by Chip (rapper)
 Coward-McCann, later Coward, McCann & Geoghegan, an American publisher acquired by G. P. Putnam's Sons

Other uses
Coward (surname), a surname, and a list of people with the name
Coward, South Carolina, a town in the US